Nam Eun-Young (Korean: 남은영; born March 20, 1970), also spelled as Nam Eun-Yeong is a South Korean team handball player and Olympic champion. She received a gold medal at the 1992 Summer Olympics in Barcelona, with the Korean national team.

References

External links

1970 births
Living people
South Korean female handball players
Olympic handball players of South Korea
Handball players at the 1992 Summer Olympics
Olympic gold medalists for South Korea
Olympic medalists in handball
Asian Games medalists in handball
Handball players at the 1994 Asian Games
Medalists at the 1992 Summer Olympics
Asian Games gold medalists for South Korea
Medalists at the 1994 Asian Games
20th-century South Korean women